Pseuderannis is a genus of moths in the family Geometridae described by Inoue in 1953.

Species
Pseuderannis amplipennis Inoue, 1942
Pseuderannis lomozemia Prout, 1930

References

Boarmiini